The Grocery Clerk is a 1919 American silent short comedy film directed by and starring Larry Semon, Lucille Carlisle, Monty Banks, Frank Hayes, Frank Alexander, Pete Gordon, and Jack Duffy. The film has been released as part of a collection on DVD.

Cast
Larry Semon as The Grocery Clerk
Lucille Carlisle as The Postmistress
Monty Banks as The Tow Gusher, a "He Vamp"
Frank Hayes as Female Customer
Frank Alexander as Big Ben
Pete Gordon
Jack Duffy as Old geezer / Hick
Dorothy Vernon as Irate Customer (uncredited)

References

External links

1919 films
1919 comedy films
American silent short films
Silent American comedy films
1919 short films
American black-and-white films
American comedy short films
1910s American films